Cirkus: The Young Persons' Guide to King Crimson Live is a live album compilation from King Crimson. It was released in 1999 through Virgin Records.

Track listing

Vol. 1 - Neon Heat Disease 1984-1998
Tracks 1, 3, 4, 5, 7, 9 & 10 recorded at the Metropolitan Theatre, Mexico City, 2–4 August 1996
Tracks 2, 13 & 14 recorded at the Spectrum, Montreal 11 July 1984
Tracks 8 & 15 recorded at Nakano Sun Plaza, Tokyo, 5–6 October 1995
Track 6 recorded at the Jazz Cafe, London, 1 December 1997
Tracks 11 & 12 recorded at Pearl Street, Northampton, Massachusetts, 1 July 1998
 Dinosaur (Belew, Fripp, Levin, Bruford, Gunn, Mastelotto) 5:05
 Thela Hun Ginjeet (Belew, Fripp, Levin, Bruford) 5:17
 Red (Fripp) 6:10
 B'Boom (Belew, Fripp, Levin, Bruford, Gunn, Mastelotto) 4:54
 THRAK (Belew, Fripp, Levin, Bruford, Gunn, Mastelotto) 1:04
 1 ii 2 (Fripp, Gunn, Levin, Bruford) 2:43
 Neurotica (Belew, Fripp, Levin, Bruford) 3:43
 Indiscipline (Belew, Fripp, Levin, Bruford) 6:40
 VROOOM VROOOM (Belew, Fripp, Levin, Bruford, Gunn, Mastelotto) 4:42
 Coda: Marine 475 (Belew, Fripp, Levin, Bruford, Gunn, Mastelotto) 2:38
 Deception of the Thrush (Belew, Fripp, Gunn) 6:05
 Heavy ConstruKction (Belew, Fripp, Gunn) 3:52
 Three of a Perfect Pair (Belew, Fripp, Levin, Bruford) 4:23
 Sleepless (Belew, Fripp, Levin, Bruford) 6:10
 Elephant Talk (Belew, Fripp, Levin, Bruford) 4:36

Musicians (disc 1):
Robert Fripp: Guitar
Adrian Belew: Guitar & Voice (except 6), V-drums (11 & 12)
Trey Gunn: Touch Guitar (except 2, 13 & 14)
Tony Levin: Basses & Stick (except 11 & 12)
Bill Bruford: Drums (except 11 & 12)
Pat Mastelotto: Drums (except 2, 6, 11, 12, 13 & 14)

Vol. 2 - Fractured 1969-1996
Track 1 recorded at the Baseball Park, Jacksonville, FL, 26 February 1972
Track 2 recorded at Kemp Coliseum, Orlando, FL, 27 February 1972
Tracks 3 & 4 recorded at the Fillmore West, San Francisco, CA, 15 December 1969
Tracks 6 & 8 recorded at the Concertgebouw, Amsterdam, 23 November 1973
Track 7 recorded at Palais Des Sports, Besançon, 25 March 1974
Track 5 recorded at Massey Hall, Toronto, 24 June 1974
Track 10 recorded at Stanley Warner Theatre, Pittsburgh, PA, 29 April 1974
Track 9 recorded at the Metropolitan Theatre, Mexico City, 2–4 August 1996
 21st Century Schizoid Man (Fripp, Lake, McDonald, Giles, Sinfield) 9:26
 Ladies of the Road (Fripp, Sinfield) 6:00
 A Man A City (Fripp, Lake, McDonald, Giles, Sinfield) 10:00
 In the Court of the Crimson King (McDonald, Sinfield) 6:50
 Fracture (Fripp) 11:04
 Easy Money (Fripp, Wetton, Palmer-James) 6:12
 Improv: Besançon (Cross, Fripp, Wetton, Bruford) 1:37
 The Talking Drum (Cross, Fripp, Wetton, Bruford, Muir) 6:25
 Larks' Tongues in Aspic (Part II) (Fripp) 6:29
 Starless (Cross, Fripp, Wetton, Bruford, Palmer-James) 12:07

Musicians (disc 2):
Robert Fripp: Guitar, Mellotron
Mel Collins: Saxes and Flute (1 & 2)
Boz Burrell: Bass Guitar, Lead Vocal (1 & 2)
Ian Wallace: Drums (1 & 2)
Ian McDonald: Sax, Flute, Mellotron, Vocal (3 & 4)
Greg Lake: Bass Guitar, Lead Vocal (3 & 4)
Michael Giles: Drums, Percussion, Vocal (3 & 4)
Peter Sinfield: Words & Illumination (3 & 4)
David Cross: Violin, Mellotron (5-8, 10)
John Wetton: Bass Guitar, Vocal (5-8, 10)
Bill Bruford: Drums, Percussion (5-10)
Adrian Belew: Guitar (9)
Trey Gunn: Touch Guitar (9)
Tony Levin: Basses & Stick (9)
Pat Mastelotto: Drums, Percussion (9)

References

1999 live albums
1999 compilation albums
King Crimson live albums
King Crimson compilation albums
Discipline Global Mobile albums